Leucanopsis tanamo is a moth of the family Erebidae. It was described by William Schaus in 1904. It is found on Cuba.

References

tanamo
Moths described in 1904
Endemic fauna of Cuba